Ignacio Guerreros García (born December 5, 1973), better known as Nacho Guerreros, is a Spanish actor, known for the  role of Coque in the television series La que se avecina.

Biography 
Guerreros was born in Calahorra, La Rioja; later living in  Vitoria, where he joined a theatre group, before moving to Madrid in 1991 to study theater.

Before becoming an actor he had a number of jobs such as working with disabled people, waiting tables, and starting, with other partners, a decorating firm in Madrid.

His most known role is of Coque in the television series La que se avecina. He also acted in Aquí no hay quien viva, as Jose María in the last stage of the television series.

In theater, his most prominent role has been in Martin Scherman's Bent, directed by Gina Piccirilli, for which he was nominated best actor of theater in 2005 by the "Union of Actors".

In 2012 he was named "Calagurratino de Honor" by the Calahorra town hall (his hometown).

On October 25, 2014, he began his participation in the political debate program Un tiempo nuevo of Telecinco in the section Un país a raya. He also took part in a program of street micro-theater.

Filmography

TV Series 

 2014 – Un tiempo nuevo

As an actor 
 2010 Con Pelos en la lengua
 2007 La que se avecina
 2006 Aquí no hay quien viva
 2004 Mis estimadas víctimas
 2003 Hospital Central
 2001 El secreto
 2001 Manos a la obra
 2000 ¡Ala... Dina!
 1998 A las once en casa

Theater 
 2005 – 2006 Bent
 2003 Jesús de Nazaret
 2003 El dragón de fuego
 1998–2001 Café Teatro

Shorts 
 2009 Lala
 2004 Eric
 2003 Sin remite
 2003 Memoria y muerte de una cortometrajista
 2002 Tiro de piedra
 2001 Hævn (venganza)
 2000 Una mañana

References

1973 births
Living people
People from Calahorra
Spanish male television actors
Spanish male film actors